Gaia Tortolina (born 29 June 1997) is an Italian professional racing cyclist who rides for Servetto Footon.

See also
 List of 2016 UCI Women's Teams and riders

References

External links
 

1997 births
Living people
Italian female cyclists
People from Alessandria
Sportspeople from the Province of Alessandria
Cyclists from Piedmont